Joseph or Joe Crozier may refer to:

Joe Crozier (1929–2022), Canadian ice hockey player and coach
Joe Crozier (footballer, born 1889) (1869–1960), English footballer (Middlesbrough FC, Bradford Park Avenue, Grimsby Town)
Joe Crozier (footballer, born 1914) (1914–1985), Scottish footballer (Brentford FC)